Capsus cinctus is a species of plant bug in the family Miridae. It is found in Europe and Northern Asia (excluding China) and North America.

References

Further reading

 

Articles created by Qbugbot
Insects described in 1845
Mirini